Container is a Swedish film by Lukas Moodysson. It premiered at the 56th Berlin International Film Festival on February 11, 2006.

The movie is in black and white and was described by Moodysson as "a silent movie with sound".  The only sound in the film is a spoken stream-of-consciousness monologue which is only loosely related to the visuals.

It was shot in Cluj, Romania, Chernobyl, Ukraine and Trollhättan, Sweden.

In 2010 director Sjaron Minailo adapted the movie into a multimedia opera performance with soprano Elena Vink with music by Henry Vega and Kasia Glowicka. The opera premiered at the Rotterdan Operadagen.

Cast
 Jena Malone as The Woman / Speaker (voice)
 Peter Lorentzon as Man
 Mariha Åberg as Woman (voice)

References

External links

2006 films
2000s Swedish-language films
Films directed by Lukas Moodysson
Swedish LGBT-related films
2006 drama films
LGBT-related drama films
Swedish drama films
2006 LGBT-related films
2000s Swedish films